Thallous acetate is a salt of thallium and acetate with the chemical formula TlCH3COO. It is used in microbiology as a selective growth medium. It is poisonous.

References

Thallium(I) compounds
Acetates